Johnson County is a county in the U.S. state of Nebraska. As of the 2020 United States Census, the population was 5,290. Its county seat is Tecumseh. The county was formed in 1855, and was organized in 1857. It was named after Richard Mentor Johnson, who was Vice President of the United States from 1837 to 1841.

In the Nebraska license plate system, Johnson County is represented by the prefix 57 (it had the fifty-seventh-largest number of vehicles registered in the county when the license plate system was established in 1922).

Geography
The terrain of Johnson County consists of low rolling hills whose flattened tops are mostly used for agriculture. The Big Nemaha River flows southeastward through the central part of the county. It is the fourth-smallest county in Nebraska by area.

Major highways

  U.S. Highway 136
  Nebraska Highway 41
  Nebraska Highway 50
  Nebraska Highway 62

Adjacent counties

 Otoe County - north
 Nemaha County - east
 Pawnee County - south
 Gage County - west
 Lancaster County - northwest

Demographics

As of the 2000 United States Census, there were 4,488 people, 1,887 households, and 1,254 families in the county. The population density was 12 people per square mile (5/km2). There were 2,116 housing units at an average density of 6 per square mile (2/km2). The racial makeup of the county was 93.54% White, 0.11% Black or African American, 0.40% Native American, 2.67% Asian, 0.02% Pacific Islander, 1.96% from other races, and 1.29% from two or more races. 2.87% of the population were Hispanic or Latino of any race.

There were 1,887 households, out of which 29.60% had children under the age of 18 living with them, 58.10% were married couples living together, 5.50% had a female householder with no husband present, and 33.50% were non-families. 29.90% of all households were made up of individuals, and 17.70% had someone living alone who was 65 years of age or older. The average household size was 2.35 and the average family size was 2.92.

The county population contained 24.20% under the age of 18, 5.70% from 18 to 24, 24.40% from 25 to 44, 23.60% from 45 to 64, and 22.00% who were 65 years of age or older. The median age was 42 years. For every 100 females there were 91.90 males. For every 100 females age 18 and over, there were 90.80 males.

The median income for a household in the county was $32,460, and the median income for a family was $41,000. Males had a median income of $26,282 versus $20,799 for females. The per capita income for the county was $16,437. About 6.70% of families and 8.90% of the population were below the poverty line, including 10.50% of those under age 18 and 11.10% of those age 65 or over.

Communities

City 

 Tecumseh (county seat)

Villages 

 Cook
 Crab Orchard
 Elk Creek
 Sterling

Unincorporated communities 

 Saint Mary
 Vesta

Politics
Johnson County voters have been reliably Republican for decades. In no national election since 1964 has the county selected a Democratic Party candidate (as of 2020).

See also
 National Register of Historic Places listings in Johnson County, Nebraska

References

 
1857 establishments in Nebraska Territory
Populated places established in 1857